Razmadze is a Georgian surname which may refer to:

Andrea Razmadze, Georgian mathematician
Bessarion Razmadze, Georgian fashion designer
Levan Razmadze, Georgian judoka
Luka Razmadze, Georgian footballer

Surnames of Georgian origin
Georgian-language surnames